The Hopi Reservation (Hopi: Hopituskwa) is a Native American reservation for the Hopi and Arizona Tewa people, surrounded entirely by the Navajo Nation, in Navajo and Coconino counties in north-eastern Arizona, United States. The site has a land area of 2,531.773 sq mi (6,557.262 km²) and as of the 2000 census had a population of 6,946.

The two nations formerly shared the Navajo–Hopi Joint Use Area until the Navajo–Hopi land settlement act created an artificial boundary through the area. The partition of this area, commonly known as Big Mountain, by acts of Congress in 1974 and 1996, has resulted in continuing controversy.

The system of villages unites three mesas in the pueblo style traditionally used by the Hopi. Walpi is the oldest village on First Mesa, having been established in 1690 after the villages at the foot of mesa Koechaptevela were abandoned for fear of Spanish reprisal after the 1680 Pueblo Revolt.  The Tewa people live on First Mesa. Hopi also occupy the Second Mesa and Third Mesa. The community of Winslow West is off-reservation trust land of the Hopi tribe.

The Hopi Tribal Council is the local governing body consisting of elected officials from the various reservation villages. Its powers were given to it under the Hopi Tribal Constitution.

The Hopi consider their life on the reservation (in particular the traditional clan residence, the spiritual life of the kivas on the mesa, and their dependence on corn) an integral and critically sustaining part of the "fourth world". Hopi High School is the secondary education institute for reservation residents. 
Hopi Radio, a station with a mix of traditional Hopi and typical American programming is run for the reservation and provides internships for Hopi High School.

Communities

 Keams Canyon
 Lower and Upper Moenkopi
 Polacca
 Winslow West
 Yuuwelo Paaki (Spider Mound)
 New Oraibi (Kiqotsmovi, Kykotsmovi)

First Mesa
 Waalpi (Walpi)
 Hanoki (Hano or Tewa)
 Sitsomovi (Sichomovi)

Second Mesa
 Songoopavi (Shongopavi)
 Musangnuvi (Mishongnovi)
 Sipawlavi (Shipaulovi)

Third Mesa
 Hoatvela (Hotevilla)
 Paaqavi (Bacavi)
 Munqapi (Moencopi)
 Orayvi (Oraibi)

Time zone

The Hopi Reservation lies within the Mountain Time Zone, like most of Arizona, but unlike the surrounding Navajo Nation, it does not observe daylight saving time.

Aerial views
Aerial views looking north along the central three of the reservation's five major washes, from west to east:

See also
 Hopi flag

References

 Hopi Reservation and Off-Reservation Trust Land, Arizona – United States Census Bureau

External links
 The Hopi Tribe
 Hopi Radio

 
American Indian reservations in Arizona
Hopi
Geography of Coconino County, Arizona
Geography of Navajo County, Arizona